Murat may refer to:

Places

Australia
 Murat Bay, a bay in South Australia
 Murat Marine Park, a marine protected area

France
 Murat, Allier, a commune in the department of Allier
 Murat, Cantal, a commune in the department of Cantal

Elsewhere
 Murat, Iran, a village in Lorestan Province
 Murat Rural LLG, a local government area in New Ireland Province, Papua New Guinea
 Murat River, Turkey
 Murat, Wisconsin, United States, an unincorporated community

Other uses
 Murat (name), people with the given name or surname
 Murat Centre, an entertainment venue in Indianapolis, Indiana currently known as the Old National Centre
 Murat Shrine, a masonic building in Indianapolis, Indiana

See also
 Murat-le-Quaire, a commune in the department of Puy-de-Dôme, France
 Murat-sur-Vèbre, a commune in the department of Tarn, France
 Gourdon-Murat, a commune in the Corrèze department in central France
 Marat (disambiguation)
 Murad (disambiguation)